Rugby Club Massy Essonne is a French rugby union club from Massy, Essonne that play in Pro D2, the second tier of the French league system.

They are based in Massy, Essonne, in the southern suburbs of Paris and were founded in 1971. They were promoted from the Fédérale 1 at the end of the 2011–12 season, entering professional rugby for the first time in their history.

Their stay in Pro D2 was short-lived: they were demoted at the end of the 2012–13 Rugby Pro D2 season.  On 24 May 2014, it was announced that they had won promotion back to Pro D2 for the 2014–15 season as a result of winning the Fédérale 1 semi-final 17 – 9 against Tyrosse. They went on to lose the final 18–14 to Montauban.

Massy were again relegated after only one season, finishing bottom on the 2014–15 Pro D2 table. They would return to Pro D2 after winning the promotion group in the 2016–17 Fédérale 1 regular season.

Current squad

The squad for the 2022–23 season is:

Espoirs squad

Current standings

References

External links
Official website

Rugby clubs established in 1971
Massy
Essonne